Philippe Ramos (born 1966) is a French film director, screenwriter and film editor. He directed an adaptation of Moby-Dick: Capitaine Achab with Valérie Crunchant and Frédéric Bonpart in 2004.

Ramos is considered to be associated with the "new" French New Wave, alongside directors such as Yves Caumon, Jean-Paul Civeyrac, and François Ozon. He directed the 2011 historical film The Silence of Joan.

Filmography

References

External links

Living people
French film directors
1966 births
French screenwriters
French film editors
People from Drôme